TeRra Han's live performance album at the Tokyo Suginami Public Hall in Japan 2015. TeRra performed Choi Ok Sam kayageum sanjo full version, which is National intangible heritage of South Korea No.23, and it was tour concert in Carnegie Hall, New York, Suginami Public Hall and National Gugak Center of Korea, 2015.

Track listing

Personnel 
 Han Terra – Kayageum

References

Han Terra albums
2015 live albums